The Copper River and Northwestern Railway Bunkhouse and Messhouse are historic railroad worker facilities on Third Street in Chitina, Alaska. It has a porch on the east side, and a timber-braced entrance on the west side leading to a root cellar under the building. It has an enclosed porch on its southern facade, and is divide internally into two large chambers. These facilities were built in 1910 by the Copper River and Northwestern Railway to house its work crews, a service they performed until the railroad shut down in 1938. They are the only surviving elements of what was once a larger CR&NW presence in the community. The buildings are now hosting the Chitina House bed and breakfast.

The buildings were listed on the National Register of Historic Places in 2002.

See also
National Register of Historic Places listings in Copper River Census Area, Alaska

References

External links
Chitina House B&B website

Buildings and structures completed in 1910
Buildings and structures on the National Register of Historic Places in Copper River Census Area, Alaska
Defunct Alaska railroads
Hotel buildings on the National Register of Historic Places in Alaska
Railway buildings and structures on the National Register of Historic Places in Alaska